Josiah Scott (born April 5, 1999) is an American football cornerback for the Philadelphia Eagles of the National Football League (NFL). He played college football at Michigan State and was drafted by the Jacksonville Jaguars in the fourth round of the 2020 NFL Draft.

College career
After playing at Fairfield High School in Fairfield, Ohio, Scott chose Michigan State over scholarship offers from Iowa, West Virginia, Miami of Ohio and others.

As a freshman, Scott was named to ESPN's Freshman All-America team. The award came after he started twelve of thirteen games the Spartans played in, missing one due to injury. A torn meniscus sidelined Scott for the first eight games of his sophomore season, an injury sustained in a noncontact incident. He was named defensive MVP of the 2018 Redbox Bowl after registering three tackles and four pass breakups in the game. Scott started all thirteen games his junior season. On October 5, Scott forced Justin Fields into his first interception of the year, and also garnered 12 tackles during the game.

Professional career

Jacksonville Jaguars
Scott was selected by the Jacksonville Jaguars in the fourth round of the 2020 NFL Draft with the 137th overall pick. The Jaguars previously traded cornerback A. J. Bouye to the Denver Broncos to acquire the pick used to select Scott. Scott was placed on the reserve/COVID-19 list by the Jaguars on July 27, 2020, but was activated three days later.

Philadelphia Eagles
Scott was traded to the Philadelphia Eagles in exchange for Jameson Houston and a 2023 sixth-round pick on May 18, 2021. He was placed on injured reserve on September 2, 2021. He was activated on October 2.

References

External links
Michigan State bio

1999 births
Living people
Players of American football from Ohio
Sportspeople from Hamilton, Ohio
American football cornerbacks
Michigan State Spartans football players
Jacksonville Jaguars players
Philadelphia Eagles players